Inverness is a provincial electoral district on Cape Breton Island, Nova Scotia, Canada, that elects one member of the Nova Scotia House of Assembly.

Initially created with the name "Juste-au-Corps", the electoral district of Inverness has existed in various forms since 1836.  The name was changed to Inverness after lobbying by William Young.  It existed continuously as Inverness County until 1981 when it was divided into Inverness North and Inverness South.  It was re-formed in 1993.

Following the 2012 redistribution, the district lost the Town of Port Hawkesbury to the new district of Cape Breton-Richmond.

Geography

Members of the Legislative Assembly
Inverness have elected the following Members of the Legislative Assembly:

Inverness returned two members from 1867-1981.

Election results

1867 general election

1871 general election

1874 general election

1878 general election

1882 general election

1886 general election

1890 general election

1894 general election

1897 general election

1901 general election

1906 general election

1911 general election

1916 general election

1920 general election

1925 general election

1928 general election

1933 general election

1937 general election

1941 general election

1945 general election

1949 general election

1953 general election

1956 general election

1960 general election

1963 general election

1967 general election

1970 general election

1974 general election

1978 general election

1993 general election

1998 general election

1999 general election

2003 general election

2006 general election

2009 general election

2009 by-election

 
|Progressive Conservative
|Allan MacMaster
|align="right"|3,155
|align="right"|35.75
|align="right"|-20.30

 
|New Democratic Party
|Bert Lewis
|align="right"|2,342
|align="right"|26.54
|align="right"|+5.66

|}

2013 general election

 
|Progressive Conservative
|Allan MacMaster
|align="right"|3,816
|align="right"|49.29
|align="right"|

 
|New Democratic Party
|Michelle A. Smith
|align="right"|678
|align="right"|8.76
|align="right"|
|}

2017 general election

2021 general election

References

Elections Nova Scotia Election Summary From 1867 - 2007
2006 Election Results (CBC)
2006 Poll by Poll Results
2003 Election Results (CBC)
2003 Poll by Poll Results
1998 Poll by Poll Results
1998 Poll by Poll Results

Nova Scotia provincial electoral districts